Anna Margareta Elisabet "Bettan" Norredahl (née Hansson; born 2 October 1967 in Östersund) is a Swedish female curler.

In 2013 she was inducted into the Swedish Curling Hall of Fame.

Teams

Women's

Mixed

Mixed doubles

References

External links
 
 
 
  (horse training center, owner Elisabeth Norredahl)

Living people
1967 births
People from Östersund
Swedish female curlers
Swedish curling champions